Hydraethiops melanogaster, the blackbelly snake,  is a species of natricine snake found in Gabon, the Democratic Republic of the Congo, the Republic of the Congo, the Central African Republic, Cameroon, and South Sudan.

References

Hydraethiops
Reptiles described in 1872
Reptiles of Cameroon
Reptiles of Gabon
Reptiles of the Democratic Republic of the Congo
Reptiles of the Republic of the Congo
Reptiles of the Central African Republic
Reptiles of South Sudan
Taxa named by Albert Günther